The 2021 Coahuila elections are scheduled to be held on June 6, 2021 to decide the 38 Municipalities top level positions around the state. Municipal elections in Coahuila allow the people to elect members of the Ayuntamiento (City Council) in each municipality. These are called the 38 Municipal Presidents (Mayors), 74 sindicos and 400 regidores (city councilors). The term of office of councilors, the mayor and his deputies is, in principle, three years. The municipal elections are sanctioned by Electoral Institute of Coahuila since its creation in 2016.

Background
By the 2021, Institutional Revolutionary Party holds 18 out of 38 municipalities seeking to retain them and with the additional goal of winning more. Governor Miguel Riquelme and PRI' municipal Establishments appointed several candidates along with former governor Ruben Moreira (2011–17) who still holds the control over the Electoral Institute of Coahuila (since early 2016).

National Action Party holds 12 municipalities, though, its electoral preferences are plummeted since its December 2018 Chairman Renewal Election when former governor Humberto Moreira almost take control of the state committee through his own challenger Mario Davila a known "humbertista". Owing to this offensive, new party state Chairman prompted to seek Governor Riquelme and formed a De facto Alliance since mid-2019 known as Cohabitation expecting to stop Left-wing parties empowered by President Andrés Manuel López Obrador.

Meanwhile, federal government party National Regeneration Movement holds 4 municipalities (Piedras Negras, Parras, Francisco I. Madero, and Matamoros) since 2018 and during june counts with high-expectations in Coahuila to obtain more municipalities due to the Lopez Obrador popularity. Morena is aligned with interests of former governor Humberto Moreira (2005–11) who seeks to come back at the state political elite in spite of several denounces of massive corruption during his tenure. His loyals known as "Humbertistas" dispute the control of National Regeneration Movement in the state against former governor Ruben Moreira and his loyals gathered around Senator Armando Guadiana.

Local party Democratic Unity of Coahuila this year, changed its loyalty in favour of humbertistas in spite of its four municipalities (Acuna, Allende, Sabinas and Sacramento) with their mayors being loyal to Ruben Moreira. For this election the rest of the political parties retain their known collaborationism reflecting on their lists of candidates:Democratic Revolution Party, and three newcomers for this year Force For Mexico, Social Progressive Networks and Solidarity Encounter Party are siding with humbertistas. On the contrary, Citizens' Movement, Green Party and Labor Party are still loyal to former governor Ruben Moreira.

Election results

Northern region

Acuna

Guerrero

Hidalgo

Jimenez

Piedras Negras

Five Springs Region

Allende

Morelos

Nava

Villa Union

Zaragoza

Coal-mining Region

Juarez

Muzquiz

Progreso

Sabinas

San Juan de Sabinas

Desert region

Cuatrocienegas

Lamadrid

Nadadores

Ocampo

Sacramento

San Buenaventura

Sierra Mojada

Central Region

Abasolo

Candela

Castanos

Escobedo

Frontera

Monclova

La Laguna Region

Francisco I. Madero

Matamoros

San Pedro de las Colonias

Torreon

Viesca

Southeastern Region

Arteaga

General Cepeda

Parras

Ramos Arizpe

Saltillo

Legacy
Thanks to the control over the Electoral Institute of Coahuila (since 2015), former governor Ruben Moreira and his candidates could won in 37 municipalities' elections through several parties such as PRI, morena and even PAN.

See also

2021 Mexican local elections
2021 Mexican legislative election
2021 Mexican gubernatorial elections

References

2021 elections in Mexico
21st-century elections in Mexico
Election